They Gave Him a Gun is a 1937 American crime drama film directed by W. S. Van Dyke and starring Spencer Tracy, Gladys George, and Franchot Tone. The picture bears a resemblance to later films noir in its dark theme regarding the struggles and failures of a man trying to take a criminal shortcut to the American dream. The screenplay was written by Cyril Hume, Richard Maibaum, and Maurice Rapf, based on the 1936 book of the same name by William J. Cowen. On March 20, 1937, director W.S. Van Dyke "announced Henry Mahan was cast in "They Gave Him A Gun", joining Sam Levene and Teddy Hart, the three swell comedians in the film version of Three Men on a Horse", but none of these actors appear in the final cut.

Plot
The movie begins in World War I when a young man named Jimmy (Franchot Tone) unexpectedly becomes a hero by killing all the Germans in a machine gun nest. But he is then severely wounded and spends time in a hospital being cared for by a nurse, Rose (Gladys George), with whom he falls in love. But she is really in love with Jimmy's buddy, Fred (Spencer Tracy), a carnival barker. However, when Fred doesn't return from the battlefield, the two think he's been killed (when he was merely captured) and so they make wedding plans. Then when Fred returns he decides to support Jimmy and Rose marrying, even though it breaks his heart. After the war Fred meets up with Jimmy again and discovers that Jimmy is a racketeer who uses his battle skills to commit murder. So he tells Rose, who had no idea. She then reports her husband to the police so he will go to prison and be reformed. But Jimmy breaks out of prison and tries to take Rose on the lam with him. At this point Fred intervenes. Jimmy, feeling undeserving, commits suicide by police.

Cast 
 Spencer Tracy as Fred P. Willis
 Gladys George as Rose Duffy
 Franchot Tone as James "Jimmy" Davis
 Edgar Dearing as Sgt. Meadowlark
 Mary Lou Treen as Saxe 
 Cliff Edwards as Laro
 Charles Trowbridge as Judge

Box office
According to MGM records the film earned $718,000 in the US and Canada and $595,000 elsewhere resulting in a profit of $253,000.

References

External links 
 
 
 
 

1937 films
American crime drama films
American black-and-white films
1937 crime drama films
Films based on American novels
Films directed by W. S. Van Dyke
Films set in the 1910s
American World War I films
Films shot in California
Metro-Goldwyn-Mayer films
Films with screenplays by Richard Maibaum
Films produced by Harry Rapf
1930s English-language films
1930s American films
Films with screenplays by Maurice Rapf